The Rice House in Richmond, Virginia is a residence designed by modernist architect Richard Neutra and built in the mid-1960s on Lock Island in the James River. Since 1999 the house has been listed on the National Register of Historic Places. The house is notable as being one of the only house in Richmond built in the International Style.

Characteristic of many of Neutra's houses, the architecture features strong horizontal elements detailed in what appear to be concrete, but are actually faced wood and steel beams. The 6,000 square foot house is made of marble from Georgia and is stretched out along a granite ridge running parallel to the river. Perched 110-feet above the James River, the living room of the Rice House offers a view overlooking Williams Dam. Fenestration is provided by expansive floor-to-ceiling windows and sliding glass doors. Other details of the house follow the International Style: exterior railings, balconies and layered, flat roofs.

History
The Rice House is named for Walter Lyman Rice (1903–1998), a retired top executive of the Reynolds Metals Company who served as United States Ambassador to Australia from 1969 through 1973, and his wife, Inger, a native of Denmark, who commissioned Neutra in 1962. Construction took place between 1962 and 1965.

See also
 National Register of Historic Places listings in Richmond, Virginia

References

Richard Neutra buildings
Houses on the National Register of Historic Places in Virginia
Houses completed in 1962
National Register of Historic Places in Richmond, Virginia
International style architecture in Virginia
Houses in Richmond, Virginia